The following is a list of chapters of the long-running manga series KochiKame: Tokyo Beat Cops. Written and illustrated by Osamu Akimoto, it has been continuously serialized in Weekly Shōnen Jump and other manga magazines since September 1977, making it the longest-running continuously serialized manga in history. 1960 chapters have been collected in 200 tankōbon volumes by Shueisha. As of the publication of volume 168, the series had sold over 145 million copies. Some of chapters were not collected in tankōbon format.

The series takes place in the present day in and around a neighborhood police station (kōban) in downtown Tokyo, and revolves around the misadventures of a middle-aged cop, Kankichi Ryotsu (Ryo-san).

Volume list

Volumes 1–25

Volumes 26–50

Volumes 51–75

Volumes 76–100

Volumes 101–120

Volumes 121–140

Volumes 141–160

Volumes 161–180

Volumes 181–201

References